The Great White Hope is a 1970 American biographical romantic drama film written and adapted from the 1967 Howard Sackler play of the same name.

The film was directed by Martin Ritt, starring James Earl Jones, Jane Alexander, Chester Morris, Hal Holbrook, Beah Richards and Moses Gunn. Jones and Alexander, who also appeared in the same roles in the stage versions, received Best Actor and Actress Academy Award nominations for their performances.

The film and play is based on the true story of boxer Jack Johnson and his first wife, Etta Terry Duryea, and the controversy over their marriage and Duryea's death by suicide in 1912.

Plot
Set between 1910 and 1915, the story follows Jack Jefferson, patterned after real-life boxer Jack Johnson, going on a hot streak of victories in the boxing ring as he defeats every white boxer around. Soon the press and others who wanted to see white people win at sports, announce the search for a "great white hope", a white boxer who will defeat Jefferson for the heavyweight title. Meanwhile, Jefferson prepares for a few more matches, but he lets his guard down by courting the beautiful, and very white, Eleanor Bachman, and when everyone, including Jack's black "wife", discover this, the tensions grow to fever pitch. Jack's close black friends become scared over his pushing the envelope of success and the white authorities conspire to frame him for unlawful sexual relations with Eleanor and thereby take away his title. It leads to jealousy, a run from the law, and finally, tragedy.

Cast
 James Earl Jones as Jack Jefferson
 Jane Alexander as Eleanor Bachman
 Chester Morris as Pop Weaver
 Hal Holbrook as Al Cameron
 Beah Richards as Mama Tiny
 Moses Gunn as Scipio
 Lou Gilbert as "Goldie"
 Robert Webber as Dixon
 Rockne Tarkington as Rudy
 Jim Beattie as The Kid

Reception
The film opened to positive responses from both audiences and critics. They especially loved the performances of both James Earl Jones and Jane Alexander, who were in the original stage play: they won Tonys for the play. Jones would get bigger roles after this film, and Alexander made a debut here. Jones later contributed commentary to a documentary about Jack Johnson that would sum up this film, saying: "To know the story of Jack Johnson is to know that it is a study in hubris."

Critic Vincent Canby referred to the film as "One of those liberal, well-meaning, fervently uncontroversial works that pretend to tackle contemporary problems by finding analogies at a safe remove in history". Critic Emanuel Levy wrote called it a "well-acted drama". Variety said: “Jones' re-creation of his stage role is an eye-riveting experience. The towering rages and unrestrained joys of which his character was capable are portrayed larger than life.”

On Rotten Tomatoes the film has an approval rating of 43% based on reviews from 7 critics. On Metacritic the film has a score of 53% based on reviews from 7 critics, indicating "mixed or average reviews".

Box Office
According to Fox records, the film required $16,075,000 in rentals to break even. By December 11, 1970, it had earned $9,325,000 in rentals, thus the studio took a loss on the film.

See also
 List of American films of 1970

References

External links
 
 
 
 The Great White Hope on Rotten Tomatoes

1970 films
1970 romantic drama films
20th Century Fox films
American biographical drama films
American films based on plays
American romantic drama films
Biographical films about sportspeople
American boxing films
Cultural depictions of Jack Johnson
Drama films based on actual events
1970s English-language films
Films about interracial romance
Films about race and ethnicity
Films about racism
Films directed by Martin Ritt
Films scored by Lionel Newman
Films set in the 1910s
Films set in Chicago
Films set in London
Films set in Paris
Films set in Berlin
Films set in Reno, Nevada
Films set in Mexico
Films set in Havana
Films shot in California
1970s sports drama films
American sports drama films
1970s American films